Cho Byung-deuk (born May 26, 1958) is a South Korean former football player and goalkeeper coach.

Playing career
Cho played for South Korea in 1980 AFC Asian Cup, 1986 Asian Games, 1988 Summer Olympics and 1988 AFC Asian Cup. He conceded 29 goals in 44 international matches and won the 1986 Asian Games. He was also selected as a member of South Korean squad for the 1986 FIFA World Cup, but was pushed to the bench by his rival Oh Yun-kyo. Unfortunately, he couldn't appear in the World Cup.

Style of play
Cho is regarded as one of the greatest South Korean goalkeepers of all time. He had a supple and nimble body, and showed accurate goal kicks. He is the first goalkeeper to provide an assist in the K League.

Career statistics

Club 
Source:

Honours 
Myongji University
Korean National Championship runner-up: 1979

Hallelujah FC
K League 1: 1983

POSCO Atoms
K League 1: 1988

South Korea
Asian Games: 1986
AFC Asian Cup runner-up: 1980, 1988
Afro-Asian Cup of Nations: 1987

Individual
Korean FA Best XI: 1980, 1985, 1986, 1987, 1988
K League 1 Best XI: 1983
K League 1 Best Goalkeeper: 1983, 1987

References

External links
 
 

1958 births
Living people
Association football goalkeepers
South Korean footballers
South Korea international footballers
South Korean football managers
Hallelujah FC managers
Pohang Steelers players
hallelujah FC players
K League 1 players
1980 AFC Asian Cup players
1986 FIFA World Cup players
1988 AFC Asian Cup players
Footballers at the 1988 Summer Olympics
Olympic footballers of South Korea
Asian Games medalists in football
Footballers at the 1978 Asian Games
Footballers at the 1986 Asian Games
Asian Games gold medalists for South Korea
Medalists at the 1978 Asian Games
Medalists at the 1986 Asian Games
Sportspeople from Gyeonggi Province